Wolfgang Paul (10 August 1913 – 7 December 1993) was a German physicist, who co-developed the non-magnetic quadrupole mass filter which laid the foundation for what is now called an ion trap. He shared one-half of the Nobel Prize in Physics in 1989 for this work with Hans Georg Dehmelt; the other half of the Prize in that year was awarded to Norman Foster Ramsey, Jr.

Early life
Wolfgang Paul was born on 10 August 1913 in Lorenzkirch, Germany. He grew up in Munich where his father was a professor of pharmaceutical chemistry. After the first few years at the Technical University of Munich, he changed to the Technical University of Berlin in 1934 where he finished his Diploma in 1937 at the group of Hans Geiger. He followed his doctorate adviser Hans Kopfermann to the University of Kiel and after being drafted to the air force he finished his PhD in 1940 at the Technical University of Berlin.

During World War II, he researched isotope separation, which is necessary to produce fissionable material for use in making nuclear weapons.

Academic career
For several years he was a private lecturer at the University of Göttingen with Hans Kopfermann. He became a professor of Experimental Physics at the University of Bonn and stayed there from 1952 until 1993. For two years from 1965 to 1967 he was director of the Division of Nuclear Physics at CERN.

Scientific results
He developed techniques for trapping charged particles in mass spectrometry by electric quadrupole fields in the 1950s.  Paul traps are used extensively today to contain and study ions.  He developed molecular beam lenses and worked on a 500 MeV electron synchrotron, followed by one at 2500 MeV in 1965. Later he worked on containing slow neutrons in magnetic storage rings, measuring the free neutron lifetime.

He humorously referred to Wolfgang Pauli as his imaginary part if their surnames were considered as complex numbers.

Göttingen Manifesto
In 1957, Paul was a signatory of the Göttingen Manifesto, a declaration of 18 leading nuclear scientists of West Germany against arming the West German army with tactical nuclear weapons.

Sons
His son Stephan Paul is a professor of experimental physics at the Technical University of Munich. His son Lorenz Paul is a professor of physics at the University of Wuppertal.

Works

References

External links

  including the Nobel Lecture, December 8, 1989 Electromagnetic Traps for Charged and Neutral Particles
 Wolfgang Paul Prize, awarded by the Alexander von Humboldt Foundation in November 2001. List of award winners.

20th-century German physicists
Nobel laureates in Physics
1913 births
1993 deaths
German Nobel laureates
Academic staff of the University of Bonn
Nuclear program of Nazi Germany
Technical University of Munich alumni
Technical University of Berlin alumni
Academic staff of the Technical University of Berlin
Grand Crosses with Star and Sash of the Order of Merit of the Federal Republic of Germany
Recipients of the Pour le Mérite (civil class)
Mass spectrometrists
People associated with CERN